Jadwiga Dziubińska (born 10 October 1874 in Warsaw, died 28 January 1937), was a Polish politician. She was among the first women elected to the Polish Sejm after Polish independence in 1918.

References 

1874 births
1937 deaths
Politicians from Warsaw
People from Warsaw Governorate
Polish People's Party "Wyzwolenie" politicians
People's Party (Poland) politicians
Members of the Legislative Sejm of the Second Polish Republic
20th-century Polish women politicians